The 2017 Memphis Tigers football team represented the University of Memphis in the 2017 NCAA Division I FBS football season. The Tigers played their home games at the Liberty Bowl Memorial Stadium in Memphis, Tennessee and competed in the West Division of the American Athletic Conference. They were led by second-year head coach Mike Norvell. They finished the season 10–3, 7–1 in AAC play to be champions of the West Division. They represented the West Division in The American Championship Game where they lost to East Division champions UCF. They were invited to the Liberty Bowl where they lost to Iowa State.

Previous season 
The Tigers finished the 2016 season 8–5, 5–3 in American Athletic play to finish in a tie for third place in the West Division. They were invited to the Boca Raton Bowl where they lost to Western Kentucky.

Preseason 
In the preseason AAC media poll, the Tigers were picked to finish first in the West Division of the AAC, receiving 22 of 30 first place votes.

Schedule
Memphis announced its 2017 football schedule on February 9, 2017. The 2017 schedule consists of 7 home and 5 away games in the regular season. The Tigers will host AAC foes East Carolina, Navy, SMU, and Tulane, and will travel to UConn, Houston, Tulsa, and UCF.

The Tigers will host three of the four non-conference opponents, Louisiana-Monroe from the Sun Belt Conference, Southern Illinois from the Missouri Valley Football Conference and UCLA from the Pac-12 Conference. Memphis was supposed travel to Georgia State from the Sun Belt Conference before Hurricane Irma caused their conference opener at UCF to be rescheduled over the Georgia State game.

Game summaries

Louisiana–Monroe

UCLA

Southern Illinois

at UCF

at UConn

Navy

at Houston

Tulane

at Tulsa

SMU

East Carolina

at UCF–AAC Championship

vs. Iowa State–Liberty Bowl

Rankings

Players in the 2018 NFL Draft

References

Memphis
Memphis Tigers football seasons
Memphis Tigers football